Typhoon Vera, known in the Philippines as Typhoon Bebeng, brought significant flooding to the Philippines in July 1983. The monsoon trough spawned a tropical depression on July 12 east of the Philippines. Although the depression was initially slow to organize, the system headed west-northwestward, strengthening to a tropical storm the following day and a typhoon on the July 14. Vera moved onshore early the next day as a minimal typhoon in the Philippines before weakening slightly over the islands. After crossing Hainan while still at peak intensity and moving into the northern portion of the Gulf of Tonkin, Vera gradually weakened before moving ashore in northern Vietnam on July 18. By July 19, Vera had dissipated inland.

Across the Philippines, Typhoon Vera killed 123 and left 60 missing and 45 hurt. Approximately 200,000 people were homeless. The typhoon destroyed 29,054 dwellings and "badly" damaged 5,558 others. A total of 76,346 homes were "partially" damaged. Moreover, 24,280 people sought shelter due to Vera. Around 80% of Manila's residents lost power. Many low-lying areas of Manila were underwater while strong winds damaged homes and trees. The province of Bataan sustained the worst damage from the storm and 10 nearby villages were destroyed. Throughout the province, 50 people perished, primarily due to drownings. In all, damage totaled $42 million (1983 USD). In addition to the impact on the Philippines, Typhoon Vera claimed three lives in Vietnam and damaged 2,500 houses. Offshore China, a swimmer drowned due to rough seas caused by Vera.

Meteorological history

The origins of Typhoon Vera can be traced back to a poorly organized monsoon trough that extended westward from the Philippines to the 160th meridian east in early July 1983. On July 4, the storm developed a persistent circulation. Four days later, a pair of organized areas of convection began to form, one near the 120th meridian east and another close to Guam. A Tropical Cyclone Formation Alert (TCFA) was issued at 0600 UTC on July 10 after the storm developed a well-defined upper-level circulation. However, further development was slow to occur and the TCFA was re-issued 24 hours later despite Hurricane Hunters suggesting that the storm did not have a low-level circulation. Early on July 12, the Joint Typhoon Warning Center (JTWC) upgraded the system into a tropical depression after Hurricane Hunters indicated that the system had developed a closed wind circulation. Twelve hours later, the Japan Meteorological Agency (JMA) classified the system as a tropical storm, bypassing the tropical depression stage.

After tropical cyclogenesis, the depression began to strengthen quite steadily. Meanwhile, the storm slowed down, and by July 13, Vera turned west-northwest and towards the Central Philippines. At 1200 UTC, the JMA estimated that Vera had deepened into a severe tropical storm. Several hours later, the JTWC upgraded the storm into a typhoon. At 0000 UTC on July 14, the JMA upgraded Vera into a typhoon while skirting Samar. Around this time, the Philippine Atmospheric, Geophysical and Astronomical Services Administration also monitored the storm and assigned it with the local name Bebeng. Even though meteorologists from the JTWC anticipated weakening as the storm moved through the island group, this did not occur. Convention gradually increased, until very early on July 15, when the storm started to interact with rugged terrain near Manila. Around this time, the JMA downgraded Vera into a severe tropical storm as it passed very close to Manila Bay. Late on July 15, the storm began to reintensify and the JTWC upgraded Vera back to typhoon status. Early the following morning, the JMA followed suit. After crossing Hai-Nan at peak intensity and moving into the northern portion of the Gulf of Tonkin, Vera slowly weakened before moving ashore near Haiphong at around 0000 UTC on July 18. Severe Tropical Storm Vera rapidly weakened over land and by July 19, the JMA stopped monitoring Vera.

Impact and aftermath

Philippines
Prior to the arrival of Vera, schools and government offices were shut down. Railway services were suspended; Philippine Airlines called off domestic services. Upon making landfall, Vera became the first storm to hit the nation in eight months while helping to relieve drought conditions. Typhoon Vera killed 123 and left 60 others missing across the Philippines, including 100 in Luzon alone. A total of 145 people were also injured. Around 200,000 people were homeless. The typhoon destroyed 29,054 houses and "badly" damaged 5,558 others. A total of 76,346 homes were "partially" damaged, which directly affected 628,985 people. According to authorities, 24,280 persons sought shelter. Moreover, more than 40 domestic flights were canceled due to the storm.

About 80% of Manila's 7 million residents lost power due to the storm. Low-lying areas of Manila were underwater as strong winds blew away roofs of shacks and uprooted trees. Throughout the city, four deaths happened. One man was electrocuted while another man was crushed by debris. Fifty people were confirmed to have died and 2,089 dwellings were damaged in nearby Bataan after storm surge crashed into the area. Most of the casualties in Bataan were due to drownings; the city was also the hardest hit by the storm. Throughout the area near Bataan, 10 villages were destroyed. In Pantalan Luma, all but four of the town's 400 huts were destroyed.

About 30 houses in San Pablo, Laguna were either demolished by strong winds or by falling coconut trees. Elsewhere, in Zambales, a woman was killed after she was struck by lightning. In Lucena City, a farmer was swept away via floods and two boys died due to fallen trees. The resort city of Legaspi suffered severe damage because hundreds of dwellings were destroyed, forcing many residents to seek shelter in schools or churches. Along the east coast of Luzon, seven people perished when hit by falling coconut trees in Quezon. Meanwhile, three casualties occurred in a fire in the province of Sorsogon. A total of 15 people drowned in the town of Sexmoan. The nearby towns of Macabebe and Masantol saw two drownings each. In the city of Manila or the provinces of Batangas, Quezon, Laguna, and Cavite, 34,000 people were displaced. Overall, damage totaled $42 million (1983 USD). Infrastructure damage totaled $31 million. However, damage to crops totaled to only $9.4 million since residents were just beginning to replant fields.

According to the Philippine Red Cross, 26,845 families necessitated emergency assistance. Government agencies were ordered to arrest profiteers, hoarders and looters. President Ferdinand Marcos ordered all relief agencies to submit damage reports so emergency funds can be issued.

Vietnam and China
After striking Vietnam, Typhoon Vera claimed three lives and damaged 2,500 houses. Heavy rains helped alleviate a prolonged drought in northern Vietnam that previously prevented the planting of rice. Because Typhoon Vera posed a threat to Southern China, 36 bulletins were issued by the Hong Kong Royal Observatory. A Typhoon signal No. 3 was also issued. In addition, the storm generated showers and squally weather in the region. One swimmer drowned due to rough seas.

See also

Other storms named Vera
Typhoon Rammasun - Had a similar track
Typhoon Fengshen (2008)
Typhoon Conson (2010)

Notes

References

Typhoons in the Philippines
1983 Pacific typhoon season
Typhoons
1983 in Vietnam
1983 disasters in the Philippines
1983 disasters in China
Vera